Helicia subcordata is a species of plant in the family Proteaceae. It is endemic to Papua New Guinea.  It is threatened by habitat loss.

References

Flora of Papua New Guinea
subcordata
Critically endangered plants
Taxonomy articles created by Polbot